Norwegian County Road 5378 is a county road in the municipalities of Ulvik and Ullensvang in Vestland county, Norway.

The road branches off from Norwegian County Road 572 at Vallaviki and continues along the west side of the Eid Fjord before terminating in Djønno. Along the way, it passes through the  Djønno Tunnel. It is also named Tjoflotvegen 'Tjoflot Road' along its course in Ulvik. At the end of the county road in Djønno, a smaller unnamed road continues along the coast to Tjoflot.

The road was re-numbered in 2019 because Hordaland and Sogn og Fjordane counties were scheduled to merge and there were county roads in both counties with the same number. This road previously was County Road 302.

References

External links
Statens vegvesen – trafikkmeldinger Fv302 (Traffic Information: County Road 302)

5378
Ullensvang
Ulvik